The Phakopsoraceae are a family of rust fungi in the order Pucciniales. The family contains 18 genera and 205 species.

Genera

Aeciure 
Arthuria 
Batistopsora 
Bubakia 
Catenulopsora 
Cerotelium 
Crossopsora 
Dasturella 
Kweilingia 
Macabuna 
Monosporidium 
Newinia 
Nothoravenelia 
Phakopsora 
Phragmidiella 
Physopella 
Pucciniostele 
Scalarispora 
Stakmania Kamat & Sathe, 1968
Tunicopsora 
Uredendo 
Uredopeltis 
Uredostilbe

References

External links

Pucciniales
Basidiomycota families